Fanny is a 1931 play by the French writer Marcel Pagnol. It is the sequel to the 1929 play Marius and the second part in Pagnol's Marseilles trilogy.

Adaptations
The work has been adapted to the screen numerous times including a 1932 French version directed by Marc Allégret and adapted by Pagnol himself, a 1933 Italian version, a 1934 German film The Black Whale and a 1938 American film Port of Seven Seas directed by James Whale. In 1954 it was turned into a stage musical Fanny which was itself adapted into a film Fanny in 1961. In 2013 Daniel Auteuil directed a remake Fanny of the original film.

References

Bibliography
 Goble, Alan. The Complete Index to Literary Sources in Film. Walter de Gruyter, 1999.

1931 plays
Plays by Marcel Pagnol
Plays set in France
French plays adapted into films